Baba Kartik Oraon (born 29 October 19248 December 1981) was an Indian politician and an Adivasi leader from Indian National Congress. He also participated in Indian freedom movement of 1947. He also found the Organisation "Akhil Bharatiya Adivasi Vikas Parishad".

Early life 
He was born in a village named Karounda Littatoli of Gumla district, Jharkhand state, India. He was born in Kurukh community. He was an Adivasi Member of parliament, Lok Sabha. His father was Jaira Oraon and mother was Birsi Oraon. Kartik Oraon was named Kartik, as he was born in the month of Kartik as per the Hindu calendar and was 4th child o his parents.

Education 
After completing high schooling from Gumla in 1942, he passed Intermediate examination from Science College, Patna,  and completed bachelor of  engineering from Bihar College of Engineering, Patna. Thereafter, he continued his further studies and acquired a number of qualifications from institutions of Great Britain. He is till now considered one of the most educated men of the Kurukh community and besides the foreign education he has a praiser of his Oraon Sadri (or Kurukh language).

Political career 
He held several official positions, and represented Lohardaga constituency of in Parliament of India several times, and also rose to become minister for aviation and communication of Government of India. He died at New Delhi on 8 December 1981. He was three times Member of parliament of Lok Sabha from the Lohardaga (Lok Sabha constituency) and was known to be a national hero for the people of the Kurukh people. He was also known by the name of Baba Kartik Saheb.

See also

 List of people from Jharkhand
 Kurukh people

References 

People from Lohardaga district
1981 deaths
1924 births
India MPs 1967–1970
India MPs 1971–1977
India MPs 1980–1984
Lok Sabha members from Jharkhand
People from Gumla district
Indian National Congress politicians
Adivasi politicians